White Oak is a census-designated place located on Mississippi Highway 4 in Tunica County, Mississippi. The population at the 2020 census was 692.

Demographics

2020 census

Note: the US Census treats Hispanic/Latino as an ethnic category. This table excludes Latinos from the racial categories and assigns them to a separate category. Hispanics/Latinos can be of any race.

Gallery

References

Census-designated places in Tunica County, Mississippi
Census-designated places in Mississippi
Memphis metropolitan area